Moordorf is the name of two places in Germany:

 Moordorf (Westermoor), a former municipality in Schleswig-Holstein
 Moordorf, Lower Saxony, a village in Lower Saxony